Marcin Sieber (born 31 January 1996 in Lichtenstein) is a German footballer who plays as a defender for VfB Auerbach. Sieber is of Polish descent.

References

External links
 
 

1996 births
Living people
German footballers
German people of Polish descent
FC Erzgebirge Aue players
Association football defenders
2. Bundesliga players
Regionalliga players